The legislative districts of Leyte are the representations of the province of Leyte, the independent component city of Ormoc, and highly urbanized city of Tacloban in the various national legislatures of the Philippines. The province, together with the independent cities are currently represented in the lower house of the Congress of the Philippines through their first, second, third, fourth, and fifth congressional districts.

Southern Leyte and Biliran last formed part of the province's representation in 1961 and 1995, respectively.

History 
Leyte was originally divided into four congressional districts from 1907 until 1931, when it was redistricted to five congressional districts by virtue of Act No. 3788.

When seats for the upper house of the Philippine Legislature were elected from territory-based districts between 1916 and 1935, the province formed part of the ninth senatorial district which elected two out of the 24-member senate.

In the disruption caused by the Second World War, two delegates represented the province in the National Assembly of the Japanese-sponsored Second Philippine Republic: one was the provincial governor (an ex officio member), while the other was elected through a provincial assembly of KALIBAPI members during the Japanese occupation of the Philippines. Upon the restoration of the Philippine Commonwealth in 1945, the province retained its five pre-war representative districts.

Even after receiving their own city charters, Ormoc and Tacloban remained part of the representation of the Province of Leyte by virtue of Section 90 of Republic Act No. 179 (June 21, 1947), and Section 91 of Republic Act No. 760 (June 20, 1952), respectively.

Republic Act No. 2227, enacted on May 22, 1959, created the province of Southern Leyte from the southern municipalities of Leyte that constituted its third congressional district. Per Section 5 of R.A. 2227, the incumbent representatives of all five districts of Leyte continued to serve for the remainder of 4th Congress. Starting in the 1961 elections, Leyte's remaining four districts were renumbered; the first, second, fourth and fifth districts were re-designated as the third, fourth, first and second districts, respectively.

Leyte was represented in the Interim Batasang Pambansa as part of Region VIII from 1978 to 1984. The province returned five representatives, elected at-large, to the Regular Batasang Pambansa in 1984.

Under the new Constitution which was proclaimed on February 11, 1987, the province was re-apportioned into five districts, each of which elected its member to the restored House of Representatives starting that same year.

A plebiscite held on May 11, 1992, approved the establishment of Biliran (a sub-province of Leyte since 1959) as a regular province, by virtue of Section 462 of Republic Act No. 7160 (Local Government Code of 1991). Biliran continued to be represented as part of the third district of Leyte until it elected its own representative in the 1995 elections.

1st District 
City: Tacloban
Municipalities: Alangalang, Babatngon, Palo, San Miguel, Santa Fe, Tanauan, Tolosa
Population (2015): 511,031

Notes

1907–1931 
Municipalities: Baybay, Caibiran, Kawayan (Almeria), Leyte, Merida, Naval, Ormoc, Palompon, San Isidro, Biliran (re-established 1909), Villaba (re-established 1909), Maripipi (re-established 1914), Albuera (re-established 1917), Calubian (re-established 1919)

1931–1961 
Municipalities: Biliran, Caibiran, Calubian, Kawayan, Leyte, Maripipi, Merida, Naval, Palompon, San Isidro, Villaba, Isabel (re-established 1947), Almeria (re-established 1948), Cabucgayan (established 1949), Tabango (established 1949), Culaba (re-established 1953), Matag-ob (established 1957)

Notes

1961–1972 
City: Tacloban
Municipalities: Abuyog, Babatngon, Dulag, Javier (Bugho), MacArthur, Mahaplag, Mayorga, Palo, San Miguel, Santa Fe, Tanauan, Tolosa

2nd District 

Municipalities: Barugo, Burauen, Capoocan, Carigara, Dagami, Dulag, Jaro, Julita, La Paz, MacArthur, Mayorga, Pastrana, Tabontabon, Tunga
Population (2015): 406,359

Notes

1907–1931 
Municipalities: Bato, Cabalian, Hilongos, Hindang, Inopacan, Liloan, Maasin, Malitbog, Matalom, Pintuyan (San Ricardo), Sogod, Macrohon (re-established 1908), Libagon (Sogod Sur) (re-established 1913)

1931–1961 
Municipalities: Albuera, Bato, Baybay, Hilongos, Hindang, Inopacan, Matalom, Ormoc (became city 1947), Kananga (established 1950)

1961–1972 
Municipalities: Alangalang, Barugo, Burauen, Capoocan, Carigara, Dagami, Jaro, Julita, La Paz, Pastrana, Tabontabon, Tunga

Notes

3rd District 

Municipalities: Calubian, Leyte, San Isidro, Tabango, Villaba
Population (2015): 179,594

1907–1931 
Municipalities: Abuyog, Barugo, Burauen, Carigara, Dagami, Hinunangan, Jaro, Pastrana (re-established 1909), Hinundayan (re-established 1910), La Paz (re-established 1910), Capoocan (re-established 1917), Anahawan (Delgado) (re-established 1929)

1931–1961 
Municipalities: Anahawan, Hinunangan, Hinundayan, Libagon, Liloan, Maasin, Macrohon, Malitbog, Pintuyan, San Juan (Cabalian), Sogod, Bontoc (established 1950), Silago (established 1950), Saint Bernard (established 1950), Padre Burgos (established 1957)

1961–1972 
Municipalities: Almeria, Biliran, Cabucgayan, Caibiran, Calubian, Culaba, Isabel, Kawayan, Leyte, Maripipi, Matag-ob, Merida, Naval, Palompon, San Isidro, Tabango, Villaba

1987–1995 
Municipalities: Almeria, Biliran, Cabucgayan, Caibiran, Calubian, Culaba, Kawayan, Leyte, Maripipi, Naval, San Isidro, Tabango, Villaba

4th District 

City: Ormoc
Municipalities: Albuera, Isabel, Kananga, Matag-ob, Merida, Palompon
Population (2015): 471,197

Notes

1907–1931 
Municipalities: Alangalang, Babatngon, Dulag, Palo, Tacloban, Tanauan, Tolosa, San Miguel (re-established 1909)

1931–1961 
Municipalities: Abuyog, Babatngon, Dulag, Palo, San Miguel, Tacloban (became city 1953), Tanauan, Tolosa, Santa Fe (established 1949), MacArthur (established 1954), Mayorga (established 1955), Mahaplag (established 1957), Bugho (established 1961)

1961–1972 
Cities: Ormoc
Municipalities: Albuera, Bato, Baybay, Hilongos, Hindang, Inopacan, Kananga, Matalom

5th District 

City: Baybay (became city 2007)
Municipalities: Abuyog, Bato, Hilongos, Hindang, Inopacan, Javier, Mahaplag, Matalom
Population (2015): 398,587

1931–1961 
Municipalities: Alangalang, Barugo, Burauen, Capoocan, Carigara, Dagami, Jaro, La Paz, Pastrana, Tunga (established 1949), Julita (established 1949), Tabontabon (established 1950)

Notes

At-Large (defunct)

1943–1944 
 also encompasses present-day provinces of Biliran and Southern Leyte, and the independent cities of Ormoc and Tacloban

1984–1986 
 also encompasses present-day province of Biliran, and the independent cities of Ormoc and Tacloban

See also 
Legislative district of Biliran
Legislative districts of Southern Leyte

References 

Leyte
Politics of Leyte (province)